Alexander Frank Schilt (born 1941) is a professor at the University of Houston in the College of Education. Schilt also served as the first chancellor of Indiana University East, the second president of the University of Houston–Downtown, the 22nd president of Eastern Washington University, and the fourth chancellor of the University of Houston System.

Schilt obtained his undergraduate education from the University of Wyoming, and a master's degree and doctorate from Arizona State University.

He was awarded with the Order of the Aztec Eagle by the Mexican government in August 1994, in Houston, Texas.

References

External links
UH COE faculty profile
UHD Past Presidents profile
University of Wyoming College of Arts & Science Exemplary Alumnus profile

Living people
Chancellors of the University of Houston System
Presidents of the University of Houston–Downtown
University of Wyoming alumni
Arizona State University alumni
University of Houston faculty
1941 births